Enodia (origin Greek, see Enodia) is a genus of butterflies of the subfamily Satyrinae in the family Nymphalidae.

Species
In alphabetical order:
 Enodia anthedon (Clark, 1936) – northern pearly-eye
 Enodia creola (Skinner, 1897) – Creole pearly-eye, now accepted as Lethe creola.
 Enodia portlandia (Fabricius, 1781) – southern pearly-eye or pearly-eye

References

Elymniini
Butterfly genera
Taxa named by Jacob Hübner